Possessed is a 1999 Danish fantasy film directed by Anders Rønnow Klarlund, who wrote it with Ola Saltin. It stars Ole Lemmeke, Ole Ernst, Jesper Langberg, and Bjarne Henriksen. The film premiered at the 1999 Toronto International Film Festival.

It received the Méliès d'Or for Best European Fantastic Film.

Cast
Ole Lemmeke as Søren
Ole Ernst as Bentzon
Niels Anders Thorn as Jensen
Jesper Langberg as Lyndfelt
Bjarne Henriksen
Nikolaj Lie Kaas
Iben Hjejle
Søren Elung Jensen
Gerda Gilboe
Udo Kier
 Valentin Popescu
 Cristina Deleanu

References

External links
 

1999 films
1999 drama films
Danish fantasy films
1990s Danish-language films
Romanian fantasy films